Paul Hollywood's Big Continental Road Trip is a three-part English television documentary series starring Paul Hollywood, an actor, celebrity chef and avid auto enthusiast from Liverpool, exploring the cars, drivers, and automotive profiles of three European countries and how they align with their nation's identities and cultures.

Cast
 Alexis Dubus
 Paul Hollywood

References

External links
 
 
 

2010s British documentary television series
English-language television shows